The International Students of History Association (ISHA) is an international non-governmental organization of students of history. Based and active mainly in Europe, ISHA's goals are to facilitate communication and provide a platform of exchange for students of history and related sciences on an international level.

ISHA was founded in Budapest in May 1990 thanks to the initiative of Hungarian history students who, after the fall of the Iron Curtain, wanted to forge links with their colleagues in Western Europe. At present, ISHA's members include more than 25 sections in fifteen European countries, and a number of observers and associate members, while ISHA is itself an associate member of the European Students' Union (ESU). Moreover, ISHA closely cooperates with a number of other academic networks, among them the Network of Concerned Historians, the European History Network and EUROCLIO, the European Association of History Educators, and The International Committee of Historical Sciences (ICHS), and the Right to Research Coalition (R2RC).

Activities 

Throughout the academic year, the various member sections take turns organizing several seminars and an Annual Conference. These events usually last five to seven days and take place with thirty to fifty (in case of the Annual Conference, up to a hundred) student participants from around Europe. They comprise workshops, discussions, lectures and presentations on varying topics, but also offer a cultural programme with visits and excursions. Additional leisure and evening activities are meant to provide more informal opportunities for participants to meet one another and thereby broaden their intercultural understandings.

List of Annual Conferences

List of Annual Conferences:

Other activities 
In 2009-10, ISHA took part in the project "Connecting Europe through History – Experiences and Perceptions of Migration in Europe", together with EUROCLIO and The Europaeum, an organization of ten leading European universities.

In 2016-17, ISHA took part in the EU-funded project "Learning a History that is 'not yet History'", together with EUROCLIO and several other partners. The final event (a public debate) took place in the newly opened House of European History in Brussels.

In 2018, ISHA associated with the International Association of Physics Students (IAPS) in a Series of Conferences named HyPe (HistorY and Physics Experience), that took place in Bologna, Italy. In addition, a number of Conferences have been co-organized with the European Geography Association (EGEA).

In 2022, after the cancellation of the annual conference because of the COVID 19 pandemic, General Elections were held in a New Year Seminar in Vienna, organized as a partnership with Central European University.

Carnival 

Since 1999, ISHA publishes its own journal, Carnival, in which students can publish articles of their own. Carnival is a yearly publication and is open to contributions from all students of history and related sciences (not only ISHA members).
The articles are peer-reviewed by a team of PhD students.

Structure 
The organs of ISHA are:
 The General Assembly (GA in short), who acts like the parliament of the association. It consists of Active and Passive Members, but only the former have the right to vote. Active Members can vote via one Delegate of their own section, or by giving one Proxy Vote to a Delegate of another section. The GA decides on the association's policies, the modification of Statutes and Standing Orders, and on the Annual Conference it elects the Officials for the next term.
 The International Board (IB in short) is ISHA's executive body. It is composed by five members: President, Secretary, Treasurer and two Vice-Presidents (or one Vice-President and one Vice-Secretary), who apply the guidelines decreed by the General Assembly.
 The Council represents the main aid of the Board in accomplishing the tasks necessary for the functioning of ISHA.
 The Archivist is responsible for maintaining and updating the ISHA Archives. Apart from a digitalised version, some parts of the ISHA Archives are physically available for consultation in the Artes - Ladeuze University Library of the KU Leuven, located on the Ladeuzeplein in Leuven.
 The Editor-in-Chief is the head of the Editorial Board, which is responsible for issuing Carnival, the academic journal of the association.
 The Webmaster has the task of keeping the ISHA website and social media accounts up-to-date.
 The Treasury Supervision consists of two members and has the main task of checking the outgoing treasurer's work at the end of his/her term.
 The Committees consist of an appointed Spokesperson (usually one of the Council Members) and at least one more member, plus several volunteers. Any Official, Active Member or Passive Member of ISHA can become part of the committees and attend the committee meetings. The Committees help the Officials in giving shape to the ideas and policies of ISHA. Currently, there are five thematic Committees:
 The Alumni & PhD Network Committee
 The Fundraising Committee
 The Project Management Committee
 The Public Relations Committee
 The Training Committee

List of current sections (as of 2019) 
Sections are the local chapters of ISHA. Here active and passive ISHA members work together, organize local events and plan networking events. ISHA encourages the founding of sections but allows only one section per city. The sections are voting members of the General Assembly, and must therefore elect and send delegates, or nominate a different section to vote for them as a proxy.

List of former Presidents

References

External links 

The International Students of History Association (ISHA)?! What is this and how does it help my PhD?

European student organizations
History organizations
Student organizations established in 1990